Colorado Basin may refer to:
 the basin of the Colorado River in the United States
 the basin of the Colorado River in Argentina
 Colorado Basin, the sedimentary basin underlying and named after the Colorado River in Argentina